Osimira - Belarusian musical ethno-project, formed in 2002.

Musicians
 Konstantin Kontsewoj - bagpipes, surma, sopilka, horn
 Ilya Dolzhenkov - bass guitar
 Katerina Donda - violin
 Alexei Palaichnya - drums
 Andrei Bindasov - percussion instruments
 Andriej Pałajczenia - vocals, flutes, bagpipes, percussion instruments, domra, kaliuka

Festivals
 be2gether
 Be2gether festival
 FIDOF
 Koktebel Jazz Festival
 Slavianski Bazaar in Vitebsk
 Viljandi Folk Festival

External links
 Official web-community @ LAST.FM
 Official web-community LJ
 Official web-community MySpace.com
 Official web-community facebook.com
 Official web-community YouTube

Official download
 OSIMIRA "DRUVA" (2007, RAR-archive) ]
 OSIMIRA "PROSHCHA" (2006, RAR-archive)

Belarusian folk music